Adios: The Greatest Hits was (at the time) the final album released by Christian rock band Audio Adrenaline, and their second Greatest Hits album.

Overview 

Adios was released seven months after the band had announced its disbanding due to lead singer Mark Stuart's ailing vocal cords. The album is a collection of their greatest hits, along with two newly recorded songs. The album also features a DVD with commentary from other Christian acts, such as tobyMac, Steven Curtis Chapman, MercyMe, Pillar, Kutless, Sanctus Real, and Relient K. The album was released on August 1, 2006.

Reception 

The album received favorable reviews from critics. John DiBiase, of Jesus Freak Hideout, gave the album 4.5 stars out of 5, and called it "a worthy curtain call for Audio Adrenaline and an absolute must-have bookend for a fan's collection". James Christopher Monger, of AllMusic, gave the album 3 stars out of 5, while praising singer Mark Stuart's vocals on the new tracks. Russ Breimeier, of Christianity Today, gave a favorable review, but was disappointed that the compilation wasn't more apt for a farewell record. He wrote "Audio Adrenaline deserves a comprehensive double-CD anthology to do them justice. Adios feels more like a sampler and an overview for casual fans, not the snazzy farewell intended for the longtime faithful."

The song "Goodbye" was used in an episode of So You Think You Can Dance? as it aired in Australia in September 2007.

Track listing

References 

Audio Adrenaline albums
2006 greatest hits albums
ForeFront Records compilation albums